Mesa Para Dos (English: Table for Two) is the seventh studio album by Puerto Rican singer and songwriter Kany García, released on May 28, 2020 through Sony Music Latin. The album consists of ten songs, all of them collaborations with different Latin American artists such as Argentine singer Nahuel Pennisi, Chilean singer Mon Laferte, Spanish rock singer Leiva and Colombian singers Goyo from ChocQuibTown and Catalina García from Monsieur Periné, among others.

The album was mainly produced by Colombian record producer Julio Reyes Copello, who also produced her 2012 self-titled album, and was recorded at Copello's recording studio ArtHouse Records in Miami.

At the 21st Annual Latin Grammy Awards, the album was nominated for Album of the Year and won Best Singer-Songwriter Album, being the second time she had won the award after winning for Contra el Viento the previous year. Additionally, the song "Lo Que en Ti Veo" received nominations for Record of the Year and Song of the Year while the song "Búscame" was nominated for Best Tropical Song. The album also was nominated for the Grammy Award for Best Latin Pop or Urban Album at the 63rd Annual Grammy Awards.

Track listing

Charts

Awards/Nominations

References

External links
Official Website

2020 albums
Kany García albums
Sony Music Latin albums
Latin Grammy Award for Best Singer-Songwriter Album